Black 47 was an American Celtic rock band from New York City, formed in 1989 by Larry Kirwan and Chris Byrne, and derives its name from a traditional term for the summer of 1847, the worst year of the Great Famine in Ireland.

History

Beginnings

Kirwan originally arrived in New York City from Wexford aged 19, and played in a succession of bands before teaming with Byrne, a Brooklyn policeman, in 1989. The combination of Kirwan's electric guitar and Byrne's use of traditional Irish instruments initially received a poor reception, but a year later, with the addition of new members Geoff Blythe (founding member of Dexy's Midnight Runners), Fred Parcells and Thomas Hamlin, they were playing regularly at Paddy Reilly's bar on Manhattan's East Side. The band began to play three to five nights a week, and garnered praise for both the socio-political lyrics and "off-the-wall" live shows, quickly drawing a fan base from both the political left and right. Kirwan stated in an interview that the band was "formed to be political", with the socialist lyrics attracting one half of the political spectrum, and the songs of the day-to-day life in America attracting traditionally right-leaning "cops, firemen and construction workers."

Breakout
The band got their first big break when their debut release, Home of the Brave, launched as a cassette at a St. Patrick's day gig at Reilly's in 1990, was heard by Frank Murray, manager of The Pogues, who signed them to his newly launched label. They went on to open for The Pogues at Brixton Academy in December of the same year, and following the collapse of Murray's label the band released an eponymous independent album in 1991, which brought them to the attention of EMI. They went into the studio with Ric Ocasek of The Cars, where they re-recorded parts of their self-titled album for the 1992 release of Fire of Freedom, which was described as "the most fun you can squeeze out of a five-inch disc." and drew comparisons with Kevin Rowland and Bruce Springsteen. Black 47 gained access to a significantly wider audience when "Funky Céilí (Bridie's Song)", a track from Fire of Freedom gained extended air-play on music channel MTV, becoming the band's breakout single. The song was praised for the use of a traditional jig, riotous conclusion and as "a knockout example of how Irish music can rock." A second song from the album, "Black 47", caused a stir amongst older fans of Irish music who had maintained close emotional ties to their ancestors who lived during the famine, traditionally a subject rarely addressed in song. The band followed up with Home of the Brave in 1994 with Jerry Harrison serving as producer, and a move from EMI to Mercury Records in 1996 followed with the release of Green Suede Shoes.

Throughout the late 1990s the band continued to perform around 150 nights a year both on tour and at Reilly's, but was plagued by a series of tragedies behind the scenes, and their political stance on affairs in Northern Ireland resulted in UK record companies being unwilling to support or promote the band, restricting a potentially lucrative market. At the 1996 St. Patrick's Day gig a 22-year-old off-duty police officer, Christopher Gargan, used his department issue 9mm pistol to mistakenly shoot himself, injuring two women including Sharon Callahan- Wormworth, tour manager Nico Wormworth's wife, and June Anderson, Kirwan's wife. In 1997 one of the band's sound engineers, Johnny Byrne (immortalised in the band's single "Johnny Byrne's Jig"), died from injuries suffered after falling from his apartment window in New York City not long after recording an album of children's songs with Kirwan. The late 1990s also saw band member Thomas Hamlin's apartment burn down, Kevin Jenkins retire after a car crash whilst on tour and John Murphy, a close friend of the band, die after falling into a coma after a motorcycle accident. These events are reflected upon in "Those Saints", a song on the Trouble in the Land album, released in 2000. 2000 also saw the release of the band's first compilation album to mark their tenth anniversary, Ten Bloody Years, and the departure of Byrne who amicably left the band to concentrate on his solo project, Seanchai and the Unity Squad.

Post Byrne

Black 47 went on an unofficial recording hiatus, although they maintained their live performances, influenced as much by the events of 9/11 as the departure of Byrne. The release of New York Town in 2004 reflected the city before and after the attacks, where a number of Black 47 fans, such as FDNY chaplain Mychal Judge, honoured in the song "Mychal", were casualties. Post-9/11 Black 47 had started to play regularly at Connolly's Pub in midtown Manhattan, playing shows Kirwan described as intense in order to allow fans who had lost loved ones an outlet for their emotions, and this was channelled into making the album. New York Town was a critical success, drawing parallels to Joyce's Dubliners due to it being a series of short, unrelated stories centered around New York City, and Kirwan was praised for painting a picture of the everyday life of New Yorkers, although the appearance of guest singers such as David Johansen of the New York Dolls and Christine Ohlman was noted for highlighting the weakness in Kirwan's own voice.

Following the release of Elvis Murphys Green Suede Shoes, a companion to Kirwan's memoir, Green Suede Shoes - An Irish-American Odyssey in 2005, the band released a second greatest hits album, Bittersweet Sixteen in 2006 to celebrate sixteen years. Elvis Murphy was generally well received, as despite the lyrics at times having literary 'problems' it was considered challenging yet enjoyable and for making "real emotional sense" and touching both the heart and soul. Bittersweet Sixteen was praised for being both a great introduction to the band and a treasure for seasoned fans, containing rare tracks such as the original version of "Funky Céilí".

Prior to the invasion of Iraq in 2003, the band became outspoken critics of the potential war, speaking out regularly at gigs. When the invasion was announced they were playing live, and due to the political mix the band attracted some fans begun to scuffle and walk out in response to the left-leaning lyrics of the anti-war songs. They released a collection of such songs in 2008 on an album simply titled Iraq, and the band were considered to be one of the few bands with a pedigree in political music to undertake such a task. Inspiration for the lyrics came from Kirwan's communication with fans serving on the front line, as a significant demographic of the fanbase is young men who enlist to fund their futures. Kirwan called the album a response to the war being forgotten about, as stories moved away from the front pages, drawing similarities in the way violence in Northern Ireland became 'acceptable'.

The band returned to drawing from a wider ranger of subjects with their 2010 album Bankers and Gangsters. It was noted that this album, unsurprisingly, was less political than its predecessor, and was also criticised for returning to the safe haven and not bringing anything new to the band's discography. However the album was generally well received, with praise going to the high standard of Kirwan's storytelling ability so far into the band's lifetime as well as the "rollicking spirit" of the bands. Kirwan relates his noted ability and passion in biographical songs such as "Bobby Sands MP" to his time spent as a playwright, likening his performance singing them to method acting. The album has also been considered one of the band's best, referencing the "sharp social commentary and genre-bending sounds."

Disbanding

On September 18, 2013 Black 47 issued this statement:
"In early November 2014, exactly 25 years after our first gig, Black 47 will disband. There are no fights, differences over musical policy, or general skulduggery, we remain as good friends as when we first played together. We just have a simple wish to finish up at the top our game after 25 years of relentless touring and, as always, on our own terms. The last gig we played at the South Buffalo Irish Festival was as good as any we've ever performed. Our goal now is to play another full year plus and dedicate all of those gigs to you who've supported us through thick and thin. Rather than just running out the clock we will be recording "Last Call," an album of new songs in November and as usual will be working out the material onstage. We would like to say goodbye to you all personally and will make every effort to come play in your city, town, college, pub, club, [and] performing arts center. 
Black 47 has always been more than a band, we've spoken out for the nationalist population in the North of Ireland, against the war but for the troops in Iraq, for our gay brothers & sisters, immigrants, legal and undocumented, as well as for the voiceless of 1845-47; but in the end it all comes down to the music, the songs, and the desire to give audiences the time of their lives and send them home smiling and, perhaps, with a question on their lips. We look forward to seeing you all at the upcoming gigs. Thanks for the support and the memories - lets make many more over the next year."

Politics
A 1993 Time magazine article on Irish rock in America said it was "the proletariat passion of Black 47's songs that make the group stand out."

Irish Republicanism
In an early interview Kirwan spoke of the British "attempt at racial cleansing" and exploitation in Ireland, and many of the band's songs directly relate to Irish republicanism, such as "James Connolly", "Bobby Sands MP" and "Vinegar Hill". The presence of this content has at times bought criticism on the band from listeners who are politically neutral to the situation, as well as restricting their promotion in the UK. Speaking of the period that inspired the band name, Kirwan said, "I'm not one of those people who believe the British did [the famine] on purpose... But what they did do was they allowed millions of people to starve and leave the land because they didn't want to change the particular economic system they had at the time."

They have been described as 'the musical wing of the IRA’.

Iraq War
On top of the Iraq album, Kirwan noted that the war was one which "the working class is fighting". He also stated that politicians wasted an opportunity (after 9/11) to change the world for the better, placing most blame on the shoulders of then-president Bush Kirwan argued that had there been a Churchill-esque leader then America would have taken the opportunity to rid themselves of dependence on foreign oil, and change the way America communicated with the rest of the world. He also criticised Bush for using the memory of the victims of 9/11 to justify war as the biggest tragedy that came out of the event.

Concert recording
Kirwan actively encourages the videotaping, recording and photography of Black 47's live shows, citing that no two shows are the same and its good to have a record of it. The band's official website has also encouraged US soldiers posted in the Middle East to pass around bootlegged copies of albums.

Criticism
Black 47 band has been criticized as most members only have a tenuous link to Ireland. Ed Power of The Guardian noting their minuscule connection with Ireland as being ‘sweet feck all to do with Oscar Wilde, Christy Ring or Samuel Beckett.’

They have been described as 'the musical wing of the IRA’,  which was a paramilitary organisation in Northern Ireland and was designated a terrorist organisation in the United Kingdom and an illegal organisation in the Republic of Ireland. The IRA have been held responsible for the killing of 1,705 people during The Troubles.

Influence
They have been recognised as "the premier Irish-American rock group" who created an environment where bands such as Dropkick Murphys and Flogging Molly have been able to flourish.

Discography

Band members
 Geoffrey Blythe: tenor saxophone, soprano saxophone, clarinet
 Joseph "Bearclaw" Burcaw : bass, vocals
 Thomas Hamlin : drums, percussion
 Larry Kirwan : lead vocals, guitar
 Joseph Mulvanerty : uilleann pipes, flute, bodhrán
 Fred Parcells : trombone, tin whistle

Past members
 Chris Byrne : uilleann pipes, tin whistle, bodhrán and vocals (1989–2000)
 David Conrad : bass (1991–1993)
 Erik Boyd : bass (1993-1994)
 Kevin Jenkins : bass (1994–1995)
 Andrew Goodsight: bass (1995–2006)

References

External links

Musical groups established in 1989
Mercury Records artists
Irish-American culture
Celtic rock music
Celtic punk groups
Political music groups